Montra Lai Hong is a Thai romantic-drama TV series that aired on Channel 3. It starred Warintorn Panhakarn, Maneerat Sricharoon, Natthaweeranuch Thongmee and Anuchit Sapanpong. It's the second drama of project "My hero".

Plot 
Patsakorn's father was a dance teacher and the owner of a school for poor children but he died since Patsakorn (Warintorn Panhakarn) was very young. Patsakorn inherited his father's talent and decided to open a dance school. There was an explosion at the opening and, as a result, his adoptive parents and his foster sister died. He blamed himself for their deaths and fell into depression.

Cast

Main cast 

 Warintorn Panhakarn as Teacher Patsakorn Wirayakan (Pat)
 Maneerat Sricharoon as Waenploy (Ploy)
 Natthaweeranuch Thongmee as Kwankamon Uthinthep (Khwan)
 Anuchit Sapanpong as Thanat Detsahakun (Te)

Supporting cast 

 Smithi Likhitmaskul as Nirut
 Wanpiya Oamsinnoppakul as Chanthima
 Wirakan Senitantikun as Kunkking
 Kanokchat Manyaton as Chatchai 
 Techin Pinchatri as Kuang
 Chatchawan Phetwisit as Na
 Chalit Fuangarom as Waenploy's granddad
 Sattha Satthathip as Wirot

Guests 

 Sinjai Plengpanich as Teacher Chanthra
 Pakorn Chatborirak as Major Techat Wasutraphaisan (Ben)
 Jaron Sorat as Itsara Ratchaphonkun
 Pongsakorn Mettarikanon as Khong Thamdee
 Louis Scott as Akhin Nopprasit
 Duanghathai Sathathip as Nid

References

External links 

 
 Montra Lai Hong on Thai TV 3
 Montra Lai Hong on Siamzone
 Montra Lai Hong's synopsis on online-idol
 Cholumpi Production

Thai television soap operas
2010s Thai television series
2018 Thai television series debuts
2018 Thai television series endings
Television shows set in Bangkok
Channel 3 (Thailand) original programming